Idriss "Dries" Boussatta (born 23 December 1972) is a Dutch former international footballer who played professionally in the Netherlands, England and the United Arab Emirates as a right winger.

Club career
Born in Amsterdam, Boussatta played in the Netherlands for De Spartaan, VVA/Spartaan, V&V Amsterdam, Ajax, Volendam, Telstar, Haarlem, Utrecht, AZ and Excelsior. He also played in England for Sheffield United, making 6 appearances in the Football League, before ending his career in 2004 in the United Arab Emirates with Al-Shaab.

International career
Boussatta earned three caps for the Netherlands between 1998 and 1999. He also appeared in three unofficial matches for Morocco.

Personal life
Boussatta is of Moroccan origin; he has publicly spoken about the discrimination his Muslim father received in the Netherlands. 
In 2008 Boussatta became involved with a charitable foundation in Morocco. In 2010, he owned a gym, a restaurant, and a coffee shop; he also worked as a player's agent. In 2016, he was sanctioned to court by real estate company WPM who sued him for outstanding backpayments.

In 2010, he was living in Amsterdam, and had a son and a daughter. In 2016, he owned 6 coffee bars under the Buongiorno brand.

References

1972 births
Living people
Footballers from Amsterdam
Dutch sportspeople of Moroccan descent
Association football wingers
Dutch footballers
Netherlands international footballers
AFC Ajax players
FC Volendam players
SC Telstar players
HFC Haarlem players
FC Utrecht players
AZ Alkmaar players
Excelsior Rotterdam players
Sheffield United F.C. players
Al-Shaab CSC players
Eredivisie players
Eerste Divisie players
English Football League players
Dutch expatriate footballers
Dutch expatriate sportspeople in England
Expatriate footballers in England
Dutch expatriate sportspeople in the United Arab Emirates
Expatriate footballers in the United Arab Emirates
UAE Pro League players